The 2020–21 Quinnipiac Bobcats Men's ice hockey season was the 45th season of play for the program, the 23rd at the Division I level and the 16th season in the ECAC Hockey conference. The Bobcats represented the Quinnipiac University and played their home games at the Frank Perrotti, Jr. Arena in the People's United Center, and were coached by Rand Pecknold, in his 27th season.

Season
As a result of the ongoing COVID-19 pandemic the entire college ice hockey season was delayed. Because the NCAA had previously announced that all winter sports athletes would retain whatever eligibility they possessed through at least the following year, none of Quinnipiac's players would lose a season of play. However, the NCAA also approved a change in its transfer regulations that would allow players to transfer and play immediately rather than having to sit out a season, as the rules previously required.

Quinnipiac was one of the few teams to play a decent amount of non-conference games during the 20–21 season. The Bobcats played their first 8 games against teams not in ECAC Hockey and performed well, going 6–2. The team continued that level of play throughout the season, consistently being ranked near the middle of the top-20. The stars of the season were team captain Odeen Tufto and starting goaltender Keith Petruzzelli, both seniors. Tufto led the team in scoring by a wide margin, finishing the year with 47 points and was second in the nation. Petruzzelli backstopped the team to a league title and was named as the best goaltender in the conference, allowing less than 2 goals per game on the year.

With their stellar record, the Bobcats were all but guaranteed a spot in the NCAA Tournament but the team still wanted to earn capture the ECAC championship. Due to 8 of the 12 ECAC teams cancelling their seasons, Quinnipiac would only have to win two games to win the crown. However, due to Clarkson cancelling its season after COVID protocol violations, Quinnipiac received a bye into the title game, becoming the first team at the Division I level to play a one-off game for an automatic bid since 1960. In the title game the Bobcats started slow, recording just 4 shots in the first period, but took over in the middle frame. After taking a 2–1 lead into the third, Quinnipiac tried to win a 1-goal game but St. Lawrence fought back and tied the score with less than 5 minutes to play. The game went into overtime and, after less than 4 minutes, Quinnipiac found themselves on the wrong side of the winning goal, losing the title to the Larries.

A day after the conference tournament, St. Lawrence's head coach tested positive for COVID and the team was forced to withdraw from the NCAA tournament. As a result, Quinnipiac was given the ECAC automatic bid instead, though it was likely that the team would have been selected as an at-large bid anyway. In their opening game of the tournament, Quinnipiac showed none of the hesitancy that they had the game before and roared out to a 2-goal lead after 20 minutes. Once they had their advantage, however, the team slowed in the middle and allowed Minnesota State to cut their lead in half. A more even third period saw the Bobcats restore their 2-goal edge but the Mavericks wouldn't go away and, over the course of the final 11 minutes, Quinnipiac's lead was eroded and MSU tied the game with just over a minute to play. With the team having once again blown a lead, the Bobcats were overwhelmed in the extra session and were outshot 7–2 before Minnesota State ended their season.

Departures

Recruiting

Roster
As of March 17, 2021.

Standings

Schedule and results

|-
!colspan=12 style=";" | Regular season

|-
!colspan=12 style=";" | 

|-
!colspan=12 style=";" |

Scoring statistics

Goaltending statistics

† Petruzzelli and Perets shared a shutout on February 13.

Rankings

USCHO did not release a poll in week 20.

Awards and honors

Players drafted into the NHL

2021 NHL Entry Draft

† incoming freshman

References

Quinnipiac Bobcats men's ice hockey seasons
Quinnipiac Bobcats
Quinnipiac Bobcats
Quinnipiac Bobcats
2021 in sports in Connecticut
2020 in sports in Connecticut